Hemşin District is a district of the Rize Province of Turkey. Its seat is the town of Hemşin. Its area is 134 km2, and its population is 2,482 (2021).

Hemşin is a district of green hills about 20 km inland from the Black Sea. The area is the ethnic homeland of the Hemshin peoples of Turkey, known for their tradition of tea cultivation, honey, hazelnuts, traditional dress and song.

Composition
There is one municipality in Hemşin District:
 Hemşin

There are 8 villages in Hemşin District:

 Akyamaç
 Bilenköy
 Çamlıtepe
 Hilal
 Kantarlı
 Leventköy
 Nurluca
 Yaltkaya

References

Districts of Rize Province